is an urban expressway in Nagoya and Tōkai, Aichi, Japan. It is a part of the Nagoya Expressway network and is owned and operated by Nagoya Expressway Public Corporation.

Route description
Originating from a junction with the Ring Route, it extends southward to the city of Tōkai and the Isewangan Expressway. The route serves as an alternate access route to Chubu International Airport and was built to reduce traffic congestion on Route 3. The expressway has 2 lanes in each direction for its entire length.

History
The expressway was completed in stages between 2010 and 2013. During the COVID-19 pandemic, six tollgates were closed along the Tōkai and Manba routes after a tollgate operator was found to be infected with the virus.

Junction list

Note: All exit numbers and names are provisional.

 JCT - junction, TB - toll gate

References

External links
 Nagoya Expressway Public Corporation

Nagoya Expressway